Monica Bleibtreu (4 May 1944 – 13 May 2009) was an Austrian actress and screenwriter, best known in the German-speaking world for her German film, television and stage roles.

Life and career
Bleibtreu was born in Vienna, Austria, the daughter of Helene Buchholt and Renato Attilio Bleibtreu. She studied drama at the renowned Max Reinhardt Seminar in Vienna and made her cinema debut in Ludwig-Requiem for a Virgin King in 1972. Her later roles included appearances in Four Minutes and Tom Tykwer's Run Lola Run, which also starred her son, actor Moritz Bleibtreu.

She also starred as Katia Mann in Heinrich Breloer's television biodrama, The Manns - Novel of a Century, and in Hilde, a biopic of the late German actress and singer Hildegard Knef, which was released in 2009. From 1993 to 1998 Bleibtreu taught drama at the Hochschule für Musik und Theater Hamburg. 

Bleibtreu died of lung cancer on 13 May 2009, aged 65, in Hamburg. German President Horst Koehler released a statement saying he was "dismayed" by her death, telling her son that "she enthused countless people" during her career.

Filmography

 1971: Change (TV film) - Guggi
 1972: Ludwig: Requiem for a Virgin King - Elisabet Ney
 1972:  (TV film)
 1976: Lemminge, Teil 2: Verletzungen (TV film)
 1978: Alzire oder der neue Kontinent - Julie
 1978: Mittags auf dem Roten Platz (TV film) - Natalja
 1981: Obszön - Der Fall Peter Herzl - Rosa
 1982: Ich werde warten (TV film) - Nelly Best
 1982: Das Dorf an der Grenze (TV miniseries) - Hertha
 1983: Der Zappler - Stefan's Mother
 1983: Variation (TV film) - Eva
 1984: Love Is the Beginning of All Terror - Gisela
 1986:  (TV film) - Mrs. Shapiro
 1986: Mit meinen heißen Tränen (TV film)
 1987: Lethal Obsession - Cilly 
 1988: Midnight Cop - Mrs. Carstens
 1992: 
 1997: Maria - Marias Mutter
 1998: Women Don't Lie - Hausmeisterin
 1998: Run Lola Run - Die Blinde (uncredited)
 1998:  - Gräfin
 1998: Rosenzweigs Freiheit - Judge
 1999: Ein einzelner Mord - Mother
 1999: Tödliche Schatten (TV film) - Kommissarin
 2000: Marlene - Witwe von Losch
 2000: The Farewell - Helene Weigel
 2001: Die Manns – Ein Jahrhundertroman (TV miniseries) - Katia Mann
 2002: Amen. - Mrs. Hinze
 2002: Ikarus - Ida
 2002: Tattoo - Kommissarin Roth
 2002:  - Walpurgia
 2002: Germanija - Maria
 2003: Himmel Polt und Hölle (TV film) - Aloisia Habesam
 2004:  (TV miniseries) - Tante Lenka
 2004:  - Walpurgia
 2005: Waves (TV film) - Generalin von Palinkow
 2006:  (TV film) - Maria
 2006: Maria an Callas - Jenny Ritz
 2006: Four Minutes - Gertrud 'Traude' Krüger
 2007: Max Minsky und ich - Risa Ginsberg
 2007:  - Mietzi
 2008: A Grand Exit (TV film) - Vera Hartel
 2008: Was wenn der Tod uns scheidet? - Marie Dunkel
 2008: My Mother, My Bride and I - Frau Kobarek
 2009: Hilde - Else Bongers
 2009: Soul Kitchen - Nadine's Grandmother
 2009: Ladylike (TV film) - Lore Winter
 2009:  - Traudl Krieger (final film role)

References

External links
 
Obit in Variety
Article on Monica Bleibtreu (in German)

1944 births
2009 deaths
Austrian emigrants to Germany
Austrian film actresses
Austrian stage actresses
Austrian television actresses
20th-century Austrian actresses
21st-century Austrian actresses
Deaths from lung cancer in Germany
German film actresses
German stage actresses
German television actresses
20th-century German actresses
21st-century German actresses
Actresses from Hamburg
Actresses from Vienna
Best Actress German Film Award winners
Burials at the Ohlsdorf Cemetery